Ben Martin is a Liberian professional footballer playing for LISCR FC.

Career
Martin transferred to LISCR FC from Mighty Barolle before the start of the 2007 season, after scoring a goal in the CAF Champions League 2007.

Martin signed a two-year deal with ZESCO United in early 2008.

References

1986 births
Living people
Liberian footballers
Liberia international footballers
Association football forwards
Hapoel Acre F.C. players
Hapoel Nof HaGalil F.C. players
Israeli Premier League players
Liga Leumit players
ZESCO United F.C. players